Tim Civeja (born 4 January 2002) is a German footballer who plays as a central midfielder for  club FC Ingolstadt 04, on loan from FC Augsburg.

Club career
Civeja played in his youth for TaF Glonntal, before joining the academy of FC Augsburg in 2015. He made his professional debut for Augsburg's senior team in the Bundesliga on 16 January 2021, coming on as a substitute in the 87th minute for Rani Khedira against Werder Bremen. The away match finished as a 2–0 loss.

On 23 June 2022, Civeja joined FC Ingolstadt 04 on a season-long loan.

International career
Civeja has appeared for the Germany under-18 and under-19 national teams.

Personal life
Civeja was born in Dachau, Bavaria, and is of Albanian descent. His father is from Berat and his mother is from Kuçovë.

References

External links
 
 
 
 

2002 births
Living people
People from Dachau
German people of Albanian descent
Sportspeople from Upper Bavaria
German footballers
Footballers from Bavaria
Association football midfielders
Germany youth international footballers
Bundesliga players
Regionalliga players
FC Augsburg players
FC Augsburg II players
FC Ingolstadt 04 players